Elizabeth Park is a northern suburb of Adelaide, South Australia in the City of Playford. It is situated to the east of Main North Road and includes Fremont Park and other open space along Adams Creek.

References

 	

Suburbs of Adelaide